Calpocalyx cauliflorus is a species of flowering plant in the family Fabaceae. It is found in Cameroon and Nigeria.

References

Mimosoids
Flora of Cameroon
Flora of Nigeria
Vulnerable plants
Taxonomy articles created by Polbot